The 1960–61 season was Galatasaray's 57th in existence and the 3rd consecutive season in the Milli Lig. This article shows statistics of the club's players in the season, and also lists all matches that the club have played in the season.

Squad statistics

Players in / out

In

Out

Milli Lig

Standings

Matches

Friendly Matches
Kick-off listed in local time (EET)

Cemal Gürsel Kupası

Attendances

References

 Tuncay, Bülent (2002). Galatasaray Tarihi. Yapı Kredi Yayınları

External links
 Galatasaray Sports Club Official Website 
 Turkish Football Federation – Galatasaray A.Ş. 
 uefa.com – Galatasaray AŞ

Galatasaray S.K. (football) seasons
Turkish football clubs 1960–61 season
1960s in Istanbul